are a rock duo consisting of vocalist  and guitarist . Originally consisting of six members, YOFFY and IMAJO are the only two who remained for their rise to fame. Much of their work has been featured as opening and closing themes of Japanese television series and Anime. YOFFY has also worked with Eizo Sakamoto (vocalist of Anthem and Animetal), Masaaki Endoh, Sakura Nogawa, Ai Tokunaga, Ryoko Shintani, Mayumi Gojo, Sister MAYO, and Yukari Fukui on other projects. The group is also part of the Project.R supergroup.

In October 2007, the band performed in the United States for the first time at the Akiba Fest J-Pop Halloween Concert Ball in Springfield, Virginia.

Discography

Singles
All songs are performed by Psychic Lover unless otherwise noted
"TRANSFORMER -Dream Again-" - February 1, 2003
B-Side: 
Transformers: Armada opening theme & insert song
"Never Ending Road" - February 1, 2003
B-Side: "NO NAME HEROES"
Transformers: Armada ending theme & insert song
"TRANSFORMER -Dream Again-/Never Ending Road" - March 29, 2003
 by Hideaki Takatori - July 23, 2003
B-Side: "Don't Give Up!!"
Transformers: Armada opening & ending themes
 - July 30, 2003
Dokkoida?! opening theme
B-Side:  by 
 - March 3, 2004
B-Side:  by Isao Sasaki
Tokusou Sentai Dekaranger opening & ending themes
 by Marina del ray - November 17, 2004
B-Side: "TAKE MY SOUL FOREVER"
Ring ni Kakero opening & ending themes
 - June 1, 2004
B-Side: "I Believe"
Kabuto King Beetle opening & ending themes
"GAIKING" - December 21, 2005
B-Side: 
Gaiking: Legend of Daiku-Maryu opening theme & insert song
 - by NoB - March 8, 2006
B-Side: 
GoGo Sentai Boukenger opening and ending theme
"XTC" - May 24, 2006
B-Side: 
Witchblade opening theme & insert song
"Oh! my god" - July 19, 2006
B-Side:  by Akira Kushida
Gaiking: Legend of Daiku-Maryu ending theme & insert song
 - May 23, 2007
B-Side: "WONDER REVOLUTION"
Bakugan Battle Brawlers opening theme & insert song
"Precious Time,Glory Days" - November 21, 2007
B-Side: "SUBLIMINAL I LOVE YOU"
Yu-Gi-Oh! GX 4th opening theme
 - November 21, 2007
B-Side: "Always"
Bakugan Battle Brawlers opening theme
"LOST IN SPACE" - December 17, 2008
B-Side: "PRAYER -somewhere on the planet-"
Tytania ending theme
 - March 18, 2009
B-Side  by Hideaki Takatori (Project.R)
Samurai Sentai Shinkenger opening & ending theme
 - May 19, 2010
B-Side: "Beginning of Love"
Bakugan Battle Brawlers: New Vestroia opening theme & insert song
"Rewrite" - May 27, 2011
Rewrite 2nd opening theme
 - February 29, 2012
Digimon Xros Wars: Time Traveling Hunter Boys insert song
"Vanguard Fight" - February 20, 2013
B-Side:  
Cardfight!! Vanguard Link Joker opening theme
"Break your spell" - December 18, 2013
B-Side: "BIG BANG"
Cardfight!! Vanguard Link Joker 3rd opening theme
 - June 18, 2014
Gigantshooter Tsubasa opening theme

Albums

Studio
Psychic Lover - June 21, 2006
Psychic Lover II - September 2, 2009
Psychic Lover III: Works - June 23, 2010
Raise Your Hands - June 18, 2014

Compilation
Psychic Lover IV: Best - December 12, 2012
15th Anniversary: Crush & Build - November 21, 2018
15th Anniversary: Psychic Mania - November 21, 2018

Soundtrack
Tokusou Sentai Dekaranger: 10 Years After - October 7, 2015

DVD
 Psychic Lover LIVE 2007 Shibuya-Mutation - January 30, 2008
 Psychic Lover LIVE 2009 Let's Try Together - June 23, 2010

References

External links
Psychic Lover official website
 
Psychic Lover interview on rangercast.net
Columbia Music Entertainment Japan Psychic Lover section

Japanese pop rock music groups
Japanese rock music groups
Anime musical groups